{{DISPLAYTITLE:C22H31NO2}}
The molecular formula C22H31NO2 (molar mass: 341.495 g/mol, exact mass: 341.2355 u) may refer to:

 Desfesoterodine
 Pregnenolone 16α-carbonitrile

Molecular formulas